Valea Boului may refer to the following rivers in Romania:
 Valea Boului, a tributary of the Amaradia in Gorj County
 Valea Boului, a tributary of the Arieșul Mic in Alba County
 Valea Boului (Buzău), a tributary of the Buzău in Buzău and Brăila Counties
 Valea Boului, a tributary of the Galbena in Hunedoara County
 Valea Boului, a tributary of the Homorod in Brașov County
 Valea Boului, a tributary of the Jiul de Vest in Hunedoara and Gorj Counties
 Valea Boului, a tributary of the Novăț in Maramureș County
 Valea Boului, a tributary of the Peștiș in Hunedoara County
 Valea Boului, a tributary of the Podriga in Botoșani County
 Valea Boului, a tributary of the Șușița in Gorj County
 Valea Boului, a tributary of the Vasilat in Vâlcea County

and to:

 Valea Boului, the former name of Păltiniș, Caraș-Severin